Richard D. Henderson (born March 15, 1971) is an American politician who is currently the Independent candidate for the Kentucky Senate District 28 Special Election. Henderson previously served as a member of the Kentucky House of Representatives for the 74th district from January 2007 to January 2015. Before serving in Frankfort, Henderson served as the Mayor of Jeffersonville, Kentucky from January 2003 to January 2007.

Elections
2015: Henderson filed to run for Kentucky State Treasurer on January 16, 2015. Henderson was part of a five candidate Democratic Primary on May 19, 2015. Henderson would finish third in the statewide primary with 32,914 votes behind Neville Blakemore's 36,663 votes and the winner Rick Nelson's 44,397 votes.
2014: Henderson was unopposed in the May 20, 2014, Democratic Primary, and lost to Republican nominee David Hale in the November 4, 2014, General Election 8,346 votes (52.8%) to 7,453 votes (47.2%).
2012: Henderson was unopposed for both the May 22, 2012, Democratic Primary, and the November 6, 2012, General Election, winning with 11,562 votes.
2010: Henderson was challenged in the May 18, 2010 Democratic Primary, winning with 6,007 votes (54.0%) and would win the November 2, 2010, General Election, with 8,223 votes (63.5%) against Republican nominee Jeff Moore.
2008: Henderson and returning 2006 Republican opponent Woodrow Wells both won their 2008 primaries, setting up a rematch; Henderson won the November 4, 2008, General Election with 11,994 votes (73.0%) against Wells.
2006: When District 74 Representative Adrian Arnold retired and left the seat open, Henderson won the seven-way 2006 Democratic Primary with 2,771 votes (26.6%) and won the November 7, 2006, General Election with 8,868 votes (72.7%) against Republican nominee Woodrow Wells.

References

External links
Official page at the Kentucky General Assembly

Richard Henderson at Ballotpedia
Richard D. Henderson at the National Institute on Money in State Politics

Place of birth missing (living people)
1971 births
Living people
Mayors of places in Kentucky
Democratic Party members of the Kentucky House of Representatives
People from Mount Sterling, Kentucky